Rennae Stubbs and Jared Palmer defeated 1993 champions Arantxa Sánchez Vicario and Todd Woodbridge in the final, 7–5, 7–6(7–3), to win the mixed doubles tennis title at the 2000 Australian Open. By winning the title, Stubbs won her second Grand Slam title, after she won her first in Women's Doubles earlier in the week, and Palmer won his first major Mixed Doubles title. Mariaan de Swardt and David Adams were the defending champions, but De Swardt chose not to defend her title and Adams played with Kristie Boogert. Adams and Boogert lost to Sánchez Vicario and Woodbridge in the semifinals.

Seeds
Champion seeds are indicated in bold text while text in italics indicates the round in which those seeds were eliminated.

Draw

Final

Top half

Bottom half

References

 2000 Australian Open Mixed Doubles Draw
 2000 Australian Open – Doubles draws and results at the International Tennis Federation

Mixed Doubles
Australian Open (tennis) by year – Mixed doubles